A mirage is an optical phenomenon.

Mirage(s) or The Mirage may also refer to:

Places
 El Mirage, Arizona, U.S., a city
 Mirage, Kansas, U.S.
 Mirage Township, Kearney County, Nebraska, U.S.
 The Mirage Tavern, a bar purchased by the Chicago Sun-Times to document corrupt officials

Hotels
 The Mirage, a hotel and casino resort on the Las Vegas Strip
 Mirage Resorts, a hotel-casino operator; original owner of The Mirage
 MGM Mirage, a hotel-casino operator formed by the merger of MGM Grand Inc. and Mirage Resorts

People
 Briana Banks or Mirage (born 1979), German-born pornographic actress and model

Books and magazines
 Mirage Publishing, a British publisher of true-crime books
 Mirage Studios, an American comic book company
 Mirage, a 2000 novel in the New Isaac Asimov's Robot Mystery series by Mark W. Tiedemann, based in Asimov's Robot universe
 Mirage, a 1987 novel by Louise Cooper
 Mirage, a 1988 novel by James Follett
 Mirage, a 1956 novel by Ruth McKenney
 Mirage, a 1996 novel by F. Paul Wilson with Matthew J. Costello
 Mirage, a 2013 novel by Clive Cussler
 The Mirage (Mahfouz novel), a 1948 novel by Naguib Mahfouz
 The Mirage (Ruff novel), a 2012 novel by Matt Ruff
 Mirages: The Unexpurgated Diary of Anaïs Nin, 1939-1947, a 2013 book
 Mirage (magazine), an international fashion and culture magazine
 The Mirage (Al-Suwaidi book), a 2015 nonfiction book by Jamal Sanad Al-Suwaidi

Film, television, and stage
 The Mirage (play), a 1920 play by Edgar Selwyn
 Mirages (1915 film), a Russian short film directed by Pyotr Chardynin
 The Mirage (1920 film), a British silent romance directed by Arthur Rooke
 The Mirage (1924 film), an American silent comedy film
 Mirages (1938 film), a French drama film directed by Alexandre Ryder
 Mirage (1965 film), a thriller film starring Gregory Peck
 Mirage (1972 film) (Espejismo), a Peruvian drama film directed by Armando Robles Godoy
The Mirage, 1980 Moroccan film by Ahmed Bouanani
 Mirage (1995 film), a thriller film starring Sean Young
 Mirage (2004 film) (Iluzija), a Macedonian film
 Mirage (2014 film), a Hungarian-Slovak film
 The Mirage (2015 film), a Canadian comedy-drama film
 Mirage (2018 film), a Spanish thriller romance film directed by Oriol Paulo
The Mirage, Egyptian film based on 1948 novel by Naguib Mahfouz
 "Mirage" (Alias), an episode of Alias
 Susie "Mirage" Young, a character from COPS (animated TV series)

Comics and video games

Characters
 Mirage (Aladdin), from the Disney animated series Aladdin
 Mirage (G.I. Joe), a character in the G.I. Joe universe
 Mirage (The Incredibles), from the film The Incredibles
 Mirage (Transformers), several characters in the various Transformers universes
 Mirage (comics), a set-index article listing several uses, including:
 Danielle Moonstar or Mirage, an X-Men comics superheroine
 Mirage (DC Comics), two characters: a Batman minor supervillain and a Teen Titan superheroine
 Mirage (Marvel Comics), a Spider-Man supervillain
 Mirage Studios, an American comic book company
 Mirage, from the animated series COPS
 Mirage Koas, from the video game Star Ocean: Till the End of Time
 Mirage Farina Jenius, from the anime series Macross Delta
 Mirage, from the video game Apex Legends

Others
 Mirage (video game), a 1995 game for Windows 3.1
 Mirage: Arcane Warfare, a 2017 video game for Windows
 Mirage Technologies (Multimedia) Ltd., a British video game developer
 Assassin's Creed Mirage, a 2023 video game by Ubisoft

Brands and software
 Mirage Toys, a company that produces action figures, including characters in South Park
 Mirage (chocolate bar), a chocolate bar made by Nestlé Canada
 Mirage (Magic: The Gathering), a collectible card game block
 MirageOS, an assembly shell for TI-83+ calculators
 Quantel Mirage, a digital real-time video effects processor
 Ensoniq Mirage, a sampler made by Ensoniq
 Minimum Information Required About a Glycomics Experiment, a set of guidelines for reporting biological experiments and facilitate automated processing

Companies
 Mirage Aircraft Corporation, an American aircraft manufacturer

Vehicles
 Dassault Mirage, a series of military jets produced by Dassault Aviation
 Malibu Mirage, a variant of the Piper PA-46 aircraft
 Ultralight Flight Mirage, an ultralight aircraft
 Mirage (race car), a series of sports racing and racing cars
 Mitsubishi Mirage, a subcompact car
 Mirage, a class of Russian Navy patrol boats

Music
 Mirage Music, an American record company co-founded by Jerry L. Greenberg

Performers
 Mirage (British band), a 1990s British progressive rock band
 Mirage (Russian band), a 1980s Russian pop group
 Mirage (metal band), a heavy metal band
 Mirage (medley group), a project of English record producer Nigel Wright, best known for the Jack Mix series of medleys/mash-ups
 The Mirage (band), a late-1960s British pop group

Albums
 Mirage (Armin van Buuren album), 2010
 Mirage (Art Blakey album), 1957
 Mirage (Art Farmer album), 1982
 Mirage (Bobby Hutcherson album), 1991
 Mirage (Camel album), 1974
 Mirage (Digitalism album), 2016
 Mirage (Eric Burdon album), 2008
 Mirage (Fleetwood Mac album), 1982
 Mirage (Iris album), 1998
 Mirage (Jagjit Singh album), 1995
 Mirage (Klaus Schulze album), 1977
 Mirage (Meat Puppets album), 1987
 Mirage (Mell album), 2010
 Mirages (Tim Hecker album), 2004
 Mirages, by Sabine Devieilhe, 2017

EPs
 Mirage (Scarlet Pleasure EP), 2014 debut EP by Danish band Scarlet Pleasure
 Mirage (T-ara EP), a repackaged version of Day by Day by T-ara, 2012

Songs
 "Mirage" (Tommy James and the Shondells song), 1967
 "Mirage" (M. Pokora song), 2010
 "Mirage" (Alexandra Savior song), 2017
 "Mirage", by Band-Maid from Conqueror
 "Mirage", by Brymo from Klĭtôrĭs
 "Mirage", by Chris Brown from Fortune
 "Mirage", by Doro from Doro
 "Mirage", by The Grass Roots from Powers of the Night
 "Mirage", by Jean-Luc Ponty from Enigmatic Ocean
 "Mirage", by Ladytron from Gravity the Seducer
 "Mirage", by Moroccan Blonde from the soundtrack of the film It's All Gone Pete Tong
 "Mirage", by Oh Hiroshima from In Silence We Yearn
 "Mirage", by Sabrina Carpenter from Evolution
 "Mirage", by Santana from Borboletta
 "Mirage", by Siouxsie and the Banshees from The Scream
 Mirages (Fauré), a song cycle by Gabriel Fauré